Monalisa  Urquhart (née Codling; born 20 April 1977) is a former rugby union player for  and Auckland. She previously played for Otago.

Codling attended Kelston Girls' College and played for the Black Ferns from 1998 to 2010. The 2010 Rugby World Cup was her fourth successful World Cup. She was also a part of three other successful Rugby World Cup campaigns — 1998, 2002, and 2006.

Codling almost missed the 2006 Rugby World Cup because she had a serious case of chickenpox. She scored a try in the final just before halftime after running 40 metres.

Codling spent some time in France working for the British Council as a Finance and Operations Manager.

References

External links
 Black Ferns profile

1977 births
Living people
New Zealand women's international rugby union players
New Zealand female rugby union players
Female rugby sevens players
People educated at Kelston Girls' College